Terry Danko (born 1949) is a Canadian musician and songwriter who has been active since childhood. He has written, performed and recorded his own material as a solo artist and as a member of a number of groups, such as Tin Pan Alley, Bearfoot and Terry Danko, Marty Grebb and Friends.

Danko has also worked as an accompanist and/or session musician for several notable acts, such as Ronnie Hawkins, Eric Clapton, Stephen Stills, George Harrison, The Rolling Stones and his brother, former member of The Band, the late Rick Danko.

Citations

References
Danko, Terry. Canadian Pop Encyclopedia. Great White Noise. Retrieved 2010-12-31.
Caffin, Carol. "Terry Danko – Authorized Biography". theband.hiof.no. Retrieved 2010-12-31.
Terry Danko – Credits. allmusic.com. Retrieved 2010-12-31.
http://sipthewine.blogspot.com/2009/01/terry-dankos-lost-tapes-new-interview.html
http://theband.hiof.no/articles/TerryDankoBandBite1vol2.html

Canadian rock guitarists
Canadian male guitarists
Canadian rock singers
Canadian singer-songwriters
Living people
1949 births
Canadian people of Ukrainian descent
People from Norfolk County, Ontario
Canadian country rock musicians
Canadian folk rock musicians
Canadian rock bass guitarists
20th-century Canadian male singers
20th-century Canadian guitarists
21st-century Canadian guitarists
20th-century Canadian bass guitarists
21st-century Canadian bass guitarists
20th-century Canadian drummers
21st-century Canadian drummers
20th-century Canadian multi-instrumentalists
21st-century Canadian multi-instrumentalists
Male bass guitarists
21st-century Canadian male singers
Canadian male singer-songwriters